Optimus Prime, is a fictional character in the Transformers franchise. The Transformers characters were developed for an American market after Hasbro representatives visited the 1983 Tokyo Toy Show.  The characters were modified and the coloring was changed; notably, Optimus Prime was colored red, white, and blue. The popularity of the Transformers toys resulted in comics, movies, and a TV series.

In the Transformers mythology, Optimus Prime is a Cybertronian, an extraterrestrial species of sentient self-configuring modular robotic lifeforms (e.g.: cars and other objects), a synergistic blend of biological evolution and technological engineering. In almost every version of the mythos, Optimus is the leader of the Autobots, a faction of Transformers who are rivals of the Decepticons, another faction. He is defined by his strong moral character and is almost always portrayed as the primary hero of the story, opposing the Decepticon leader Megatron.

Over the history of the Transformers franchise, Optimus Prime has been portrayed by a variety of actors, such as Peter Cullen, Garry Chalk, Neil Kaplan, David Kaye and Jake Tillman.

Animated character biography

Optimus Prime (formerly known as Orion Pax) is constantly, if not always, depicted as having strong moral character, excellent leadership, and sound decision-making skills, and possesses brilliant military tactics, powerful martial arts, and advanced extraterrestrial weaponry. Optimus Prime has a strong sense of honor and justice, being dedicated to building peaceful and mutually beneficial co-existence with humans, the protection of life and liberty of all sentient species. As the current Matrix of Leadership bearer, Optimus Prime is the de facto leader of the Autobots, a faction of a transforming species of synthetic intelligence from the planet Cybertron. The Autobots are constantly waging civil war against a rival faction of transforming robots called Decepticons. According to Bob Budiansky, co-writer of the Transformers series, Dennis O'Neil was responsible for his name.

Optimus Prime is usually depicted as being a member of an ancient Transformers race called the Dynasty of Primes, often receiving the title "The Last Prime" in many stories, in which he is depicted as being the last of the Primes. In the Transformers: Covenant of Primus, it was established that Optimus Prime was the last born of the original Thirteen Transformers created by the creator Primus. It was his unique spark and his inspiring reassurance that "All are One" that allowed the Primes to rally and succeed in their battle against the Chaos Bringer Unicron. When tragedy at last ended the era of the Primes and brought forth the new race of lesser descendant Transformers he alone chose to be reborn in the Well of All Sparks as one of them, that he might know them and their needs more completely. All memory of his past life gone, he took the name "Orion Pax" and sought his way like any other robot on the new world becoming Optimus Prime once more when receiving the Matrix of Leadership when Cybertron faced a new enemy in his former friend, Megatron and his army of followers, the Decepticons. This brings a Great War to their planet of Cybertron. Optimus's origins and personality can vary depending on which "universe" he's seen in. This origin is the most consistent between the various incarnations. Further differences are listed in the respective sections below.

Generation 1
The first generation Optimus Prime transforms into a Freightliner FL86 cab over semi truck. Within his chest is a mystic talisman, known as the Autobot Matrix of Leadership or the "Creation Matrix", carried by all Autobot leaders. When Optimus transforms, his tractor cab disconnects to become a sentient robot, and his trailer opens to reveal an ion blaster, forming a combat deck. The combat deck supports a mobile battle-station and command headquarters armed with assorted artillery and beam weapons that fire automatically. The combat deck can also serve as a radio antenna for battlefield communications between the Autobots. The combat deck also included "Roller", a mobile scout buggy meant to scout behind enemy lines. When Roller is deployed, Optimus can see and hear what Roller sees and hears. Injury to one component is felt by each of the others. If the combat deck or Roller were to be destroyed, Prime could survive. However, despite the slight degree of autonomy they possess, the combat deck and Roller would not be able to survive without Optimus.

The original specification of the Generation 1 Optimus Prime specifies that Optimus Prime consists of three components: the humanoid "Brain Center" (which transforms to the truck cab), the "Combat Deck" (which transforms to the truck trailer) and the "Scout Car", a non-transforming six-wheeled buggy called Roller, which can ride inside the truck trailer. All three components can function independently, but injury to one is felt by the other two. However, in by far the most of the fiction, the humanoid robot actually is Optimus Prime, with the other two components treated as mere accessories that disappear off the scene when Optimus Prime transforms from truck to robot mode.

G1 Biography
Originally, Optimus Prime was created as the leader of the Autobots, though it is unknown how he was created or his origins. In a possible future, Megatron was threatened by the existence of the Aerialbots and had Shockwave build a time machine to send them back in time to get rid of them. However, he only ended up changing history for the better. In the revised timeline, Optimus Prime began his life as a robot named Orion Pax, a mostly defenseless dock worker during the Golden Age of Cybertron nine million years ago, with a girlfriend named Ariel and a best friend named Dion. During this time, a new breed of robot with new flight capabilities appeared on the planet, which the naive Orion and other younger robots idolized. When Megatron, the leader of the new group of robots, approached him with inquiries about using one of the dock warehouses, Orion was swayed by Megatron. Orion, Ariel and Dion were severely wounded when Megatron and his forces attacked in order to claim the energy stored there. Searching for someone to help them, the time-displaced Aerialbots took Orion to the ancient Autobot, Alpha Trion, who used him as the first subject for the new reconstruction process he had developed involving rebuilding the frail Autobot frames into more battle-hardy configurations. With this reconstruction, Orion Pax became Optimus Prime, the first of the Autobot warriors. Optimus took the mantle of leadership as the civil war against the Decepticons erupted, and would remain in that position for the next nine million years.

As the leader of the Autobots, Prime headed up their mission to search for new sources of energy to revitalize the depleted Cybertron. Optimus vowed to Elita that he would return from his mission for her, but just before the launch of the Ark, Optimus was mistakenly led to believe that Elita was killed. Shortly after its launch, the Autobots' craft was attacked by the Decepticons' space cruiser, the Nemesis, and boarded by Megatron and the Decepticons. In the ensuing struggle, the G-forces of a nearby planet pulled both craft down, and the Autobots' ship crashed into a volcano, thrusting all the occupants into emergency stasis. Four million years later, in the Earth year 1984, a volcanic eruption jarred the ship's computer, Teletraan I, back to life. The computer reactivated the Decepticons, programming them with new Earth-based disguise modes. As a parting gesture, Starscream fired upon the Autobot ship, creating a landslide. The vibrations from that landslide knocked Prime into the path of the computer's restoration beam, restoring him to life, thus beginning the war anew on Earth.

Over the course of the next twenty years, the Decepticons succeeded in seizing control of all of Cybertron, forcing the Autobots to operate from their new city on Earth and two bases on Cybertron's moons. In the Earth year 2005, Prime, stationed on Moonbase One, dispatched troops to Earth to acquire energy for an upcoming strike on Cybertron. The Decepticons, however, got wind of the plan and used the shuttle run to attack Autobot City. A distress call summoned Prime and support troops to Earth. In the fearsome, ensuing battle with Megatron, Optimus Prime sustained fatal wounds, but not before turning the tide of battle and forcing the Decepticons to flee. Despite the efforts of Perceptor, Optimus Prime went offline after passing the Matrix and role of leader to Ultra Magnus, despite protestations. His last words were "Until that day... 'til all are one." The Matrix later fell into the hands of Galvatron, a recreated Megatron, and was finally taken back by the young Autobot Hot Rod. As the Matrix reformatted him, Hot Rod heard the voice of Optimus Prime saying, "Arise, Rodimus Prime." Instead of giving the Matrix back to Ultra Magnus, Rodimus decided to take the duty of leadership, with Magnus as his second-in-command.

Later, during one of those times when Rodimus was in command, a small group of Autobots and human allies Spike and Daniel Witwicky fled to the Autobot Mausoleum from the Decepticons. There, they discover that Optimus Prime was somehow resurrected. Rodimus then returns the Matrix to Optimus, reverting to his old self. However, Optimus does not act the same as before. He also appears to be mind-controlled, causing him to go insane and commit violent acts, such as attempting to kill the group of Autobots and to trick the other Autobots on Cybertron to fly into a trap set by the Quintessons. As Hot Rod confronts him, Prime has a flashback of his resurrection at the hands of the Quintessons, who reprogrammed him in order to lead the Autobots into the trap. The influence of the Matrix eventually allows him to overcome the programming. He stops attacking Hot Rod, and returns the Matrix. Afterward, Optimus orders the Autobot fleet to move away from the trap. He pilots the Autobot flagship to the asteroid where the trap is set, triggering an explosion that seemingly kills him once again.

The death of Optimus Prime in The Transformers: The Movie received a strongly negative reaction from fans, so screenwriters decided to bring him back into the series. In the subsequent season 3 finale, "The Return of Optimus Prime", it was revealed that a group of humans had actually managed to retrieve his body prior to the destruction of the ship, but he was now contaminated by strange particles released in the explosion. Using Optimus's body to lure the Autobots, an anti-Transformer scientist attempted to attack them with these particles, only to release a 'hate plague' that turned all those infected with it against others. With the plague spreading rapidly, Rodimus Prime ordered the Autobot Sky Lynx to rescue a Quintesson in the hope that it would be able to bring Optimus back to life to lead the remaining uninfected against the plague victims. After this plan was a success, Optimus was eventually able to reclaim the Matrix of Leadership from Rodimus Prime and learn that the plague could be countered with wisdom, prompting him to sacrifice the accumulated knowledge of the Matrix to restore all those victims of the plague to normal. With the Matrix now empty, Optimus mused that all would be a little wiser now from the knowledge it had given them, and it was up to them all to refill it.

While the Transformers animated series came to an end in America in 1987 after The Rebirth, production was continued in Japan with three new, exclusive animated series spin-offs to continue the story. The first of these series, Transformers: The Headmasters, supplanted the events of The Rebirth. With the Decepticons defeated, the Autobots entered into an even closer relationship with Earth. The Autobots also began the colonization of other worlds, the first of which was the planet Athenia, where Optimus Prime was stationed. It soon became apparent, however, that the consequences of releasing the energy of the Matrix to cure the Hate Plague were more far-reaching than Optimus had anticipated. Without the energy of the Matrix to act as a balancing factor, Vector Sigma had become destabilized. The Decepticons suddenly returned to exploit this, assaulting Cybertron in order to seize control of the mega-computer. Prime took a squad of troops to aid in the battle on the planet. When the arrival of the Autobot Headmasters tipped the battle in their favor, Prime broke off from the main attack and headed down into the depths of the planet, planning on stabilizing Vector Sigma at any cost.

While the other Autobots searched for the Matrix on Earth, Optimus Prime searched for Vector Sigma, guided through the dangers of the planet's catacombs by the spirit of Alpha Trion. Prime eventually arrived at the computer, only to find his way barred by Cyclonus and Scourge. At that moment, Hot Rod arrived with the Matrix, the same with which Alpha Trion merged, re-energizing it. The Matrix transformed Hot Rod back into Rodimus Prime and, for the first time, the two Primes fought side by side and defeated Galvatron. Before Rodimus could implement the Matrix to stabilize Vector Sigma, however, Optimus Prime merged himself with the computer, restoring its balance to save the planet. Optimus Prime sacrificed himself, dying again only a few short episodes after his rebirth. Later, Prime would make a final and permanent return in the Japanese Transformers continuity, Battlestars: Return of Convoy. This entry was only available in print, appearing in the TV Magazine, a Japanese publication. Optimus Prime, Bumblebee and Spike Witwicky are the only main characters to appear in all of the seasons of The Transformers animated series and survived throughout the show. Optimus reappears in Generation 2: Redux, a Botcon magazine which is set after the events of the final episode as a flashback where he led the first generation of Autobots to pursue Galvatron and Zarak in deep space.

Transformers: Robots in Disguise

Optimus Prime is the fictional protagonist of the Transformers: Robots in Disguise (Fire Convoy in the original Japanese version) branch of the Transformers universe. Based on the character of the same name, Prime once again leads the Autobots against the Decepticons. His voice actor, Neil Kaplan, does his voice in a style reminiscent of that of Peter Cullen, the voice of the original Optimus Prime. Wired Magazine nominated Fire Convoy as one 12 most ridiculous Transformers ideas of all time.

Hidden on Earth as common, everyday vehicles, the Autobots are forced to emerge when Megatron and his Predacons arrive and wreak havoc in their attempts to attain the power of Earth's various energy sources. In this universe, Optimus Prime transforms into a fire engine. This is also the very first incarnation of Optimus Prime to transform into a Fire Engine.

Unicron Trilogy

The "Unicron Trilogy" version of Optimus Prime is a fictional character of this branch of Transformers lore. Appearing in Transformers: Armada, Transformers: Energon and Transformers: Cybertron, Optimus is the leader of the heroic Autobots. He often converted to his super combat mode. In all three series, Optimus' English voice actor is Garry Chalk, who previously voiced Optimus Primal in Beast Wars: Transformers and Beast Machines.

In his first appearance in the series, Optimus looks similar to the original G1 Optimus Prime until he copies himself with a semi-truck and his design in robot mode changes.

In this incarnation, Optimus Prime is the main protagonist and shows a near-xenophobic reluctance with interacting with other cultures, believing that such interaction would cause more harm than good. Consequently, he prohibits his team from mingling with the locals of Earth, Velocitron, and the Jungle Planet during their search for the Cyber Planet Keys. This attitude was drastically changed when Prime realized that the only way to acquire the Cyber Planet Keys from Velocitron and Animatros was to play by their laws.

Transformers film series
In the online CGI cartoon Cyber Missions produced by TG Studios for Hasbro's website, Optimus is once again seen fighting Megatron, this time with some help from Sideswipe. Optimus also helps Ironhide against Mindwipe.

Transformers Animated

Optimus Prime appears in the Transformers Animated series in 2008 as a red semi-trailer truck, able to be fitted with many "trailer" attachments, most notably one that effectively makes him a fire truck. Unlike the other Optimus Primes, this one is much younger.

Optimus has the ability to change any part of his robotic body into a tool or gadget. He has swing lines in his wrists. His wrists can also fire capture bolas. His arsenal includes a grappler, fire extinguisher and a negative friction spray. Unlike in all the previous series, his face can almost always be seen, because his mouthplate is retractable like in the 2007 live-action film.

Animated Optimus Prime, in an Earth-based fire truck mode, appears as a hidden character in the Transformers Netjet video game by Hasbro. Instead of being the leader of the Autobots, Prime was actually a washout from the Elite Guard. Despite no longer being a member, he maintains his military ranking of "Prime". The scale chart released for the series indicates Optimus Prime stands about 22 feet tall.

In the animated series, Optimus Prime was originally in the Autobot Academy and friends with Sentinel Prime and Elita One. When Elita is lost on a planet dominated by a giant spider-like aliens, he blames himself for leaving her behind, where she supposedly dies in the explosion of a wrecked Decepticon warship loaded with Energon. Sentinel doesn't forgive him for losing her and Optimus takes full responsibility for Elita's demise. This caused Optimus Prime to wash out of the Autobot Academy. However, Ultra Magnus pulls some strings so that Optimus Prime could be captain of a strange Space Bridge repair crew composed of a war vet named Ratchet, a fledgling cadet named Bumblebee, and his fellow cadet Bulkhead. Optimus is given command of the starship which is the vehicle mode of Omega Supreme.

Optimus Prime appears among the characters in Re-Unification, the 2010 TFCon voice actor play prelude comic.

Aligned Continuity

Optimus Prime is the leader of the main group of Autobots in the iteration of the Transformers franchise primarily marked by the 2010 computer-animated series Transformers: Prime on The Hub. Optimus Prime was created as the last of the Thirteen Primes, the first generation of Transformers, each created directly by Primus as a band of unique warriors to combat and defeat Unicron. Upon his creation, Optimus united the Thirteen by his greeting All are one. While all of the other members of the Thirteen each possessed unique abilities and artifacts, Optimus wielded no special powers or weapons. It was only his vision and courage that allowed the Thirteen to finally defeat Unicron. Reborn through the Well of All Sparks, Orion Pax became Optimus Prime, a veteran military commander and second in command who wields an ion blaster and a double-bladed Energon axe. He became the leader of the Autobots after Sentinel Zeta Prime fell in battle, but is not certain he wants the responsibility.

In the Transformers: Prime series, he can form bladed weapons or blasters from his hands. He has a telescopic vision and turns into a long-nose semi-trailer truck. Before the Great War, Optimus Prime was originally known as Orion Pax; a young data clerk who worked in Iacon, under the wing of Alpha Trion. Orion was chosen by the High Council and became "Optimus Prime", upon being entrusted with the Matrix of Leadership by Primus himself.

Voice actors
Optimus Prime is primarily voiced by Peter Cullen in most of his incarnations, who voiced him in the original series. Following the production of the 2007 film, Cullen reprised his role for the sequels and supporting media and would even voice Optimus in later series such as Transformers: Prime. Optimus has been voiced by a number of other voice actors in other series such as Neil Kaplan, Garry Chalk, and David Kaye in the series Transformers: Robots in Disguise, the Unicron Trilogy, and Transformers Animated, respectively.

Comics

Marvel Comics
In the series released by Marvel Comics, before the Great War broke out on Cybertron, the robot who would be Optimus Prime, before he received the Matrix of Leadership from Sentinel Prime, was a Transformer of note, displaying his skills in the Infraformers Sharpshooting Competition. When the war began, Prime quickly made a name for himself as a combat leader of the Autobots. On a mission with the Triggerbots to stop Megatron from claiming the Underbase, Prime was forced to jettison the massive databank into space to prevent anyone from acquiring its power. With this action, he proved his wisdom and skill to the Autobot Council of Elders. He continued to move up in rank, eventually becoming the field command over the Autobot armies.

Four million years ago, Cybertron, shaken from its orbit and drifting through space, became threatened when it floated into the path of an asteroid field. Prime led a group of elite Autobot warriors on the Ark, the Autobot starship, on a mission to destroy the asteroids. Although the mission was successful, during the aftermath of this mission, the Ark was attacked by Decepticons hoping to overpower their weakened foes. Intent on keeping the secrets of the Ark from the Decepticons, Prime set the craft on a suicide course, crashing it into the then prehistoric planet Earth.

Later, the Transformers were all transported to Cybertron by Primus to battle Unicron. Although Unicron had tainted the Matrix after killing Thunderwing, Prime managed to reacquire and purify the Matrix. Prime then sacrificed his life one more time to destroy Unicron by plunging the Matrix into his maw. The Powermaster process, however, had been working to fully bond Prime and Hi-Q. Prime's death completed the process, and the two minds and souls became one. Hi-Q's biomechanical body was stripped down and reconstructed by the Last Autobot, resurrecting Optimus Prime once more with the two minds now one. Prime rejoined the other Transformers on the planet Klo and routed Bludgeon's Decepticons.

The sequel series, Transformers: Generation 2, began an undisclosed period of time later. At the beginning of the series, Prime was restored to a form resembling his original body. He and the Transformers found themselves caught in the schemes of a new generation of Cybertronians, led by the icy Jhiaxus, who were colonizing and cyber-forming other worlds. Plagued by nightmarish visions of a life-destroying entity called "the Swarm", Prime looked into Cybertron's past and discovered that Jhiaxus and his kind were the result of an unintentional Transformer reproduction. Their nature and intent, he found, was distilled to the purest, most unemotional form of conquest and that the Swarm was the by-product of this process. To fight this new enemy, Prime and the Autobots entered into an alliance with the recreated Megatron's Decepticons. Though Prime was eventually consumed by the abomination and destroyed, he was able to unleash the energies of the Matrix into the Swarm, purifying it. In parting, the Swarm recreated Prime in a new form, and he and Megatron set out to lead the united Autobots and Decepticons into a new age.

Simon Furman's "Alignment", a text story available through Transforce, a British Transformers convention, mentions Prime falling during what was intended to be the final conflict with the Decepticons at Pinea Omicron, long after the events of the Generation 2 comic book. He managed to defeat Galvatron II, but in doing so, was damaged such that Grimlock had to engage a stasis field around him to save his flickering Spark, making Prime a living war monument.

Though Prime's ultimate fate is unknown, in a story entitled "The Last Days of Optimus Prime", also from Transforce, Prime laments the new Transformers age without war and passes on to a Transformers afterlife, referred to as "J'nwan". The story is vague, however, and may be a metaphor for Prime rejoining the Matrix, as his time had come. In this realm, he was approached by the Predacon Sandstorm, who tried to plead for the help of Prime and the other legendary Transformers in dealing with a Unicron/Predacon hybrid named Shokaract. Prime refused, but later led a group of Transformers, including Megatron, Grimlock, and Soundwave), to distract the creature while Primus dealt the final blow.

Dreamwave Productions
In the 21st century reimagining of the original continuity by Dreamwave Productions, Optimus Prime started life as a data archivist known as Optronix or Orion to his friends. After taking note of a battle where the Autobot leader Sentinel Prime had been killed by Megatron, he was summoned to the Council of Elders and informed that the Matrix had chosen him to be the next leader of the Autobots. He received the Matrix of Leadership shortly thereafter and arranged for the Autobot evacuation of Cybertron. He intended to leave the Decepticons to their own devices, but a battle with Megatron beneath the planet's surface, accompanied by visions from the Matrix, stirred him on to fight for the safety of his homeworld.

Some time into his role as a leader, Prime disappeared with Megatron in a spacebridge experiment, spending a period of time on Quintessa, but returned sometime later. Events during this period have gone unrecorded as a result of Dreamwave's closure.

The actual events of the Autobots and Decepticon coming to Earth were never printed by Dreamwave comics, but flashbacks of the events are printed later. These flashbacks suggest that the Autobots allied with humankind and defeated the Decepticons at the turn of the century. They planned to return to Cybertron aboard the newly constructed Ark II, but the ship was destroyed as part of a military conspiracy to take control of the Transformers. A terrorist organization, run by the enigmatic Lazarus, was able to seize control of several of the Transformers that fell back to Earth while the U.S. military was occupied with locating Prime's body. Before his departure, Prime had entrusted a small portion of the Matrix to Spike Witwicky, who was forced by the product chief, General Hallo, to use it to reactivate Prime. Functional again, Prime used the Matrix to reactivate more of his fallen comrades, and then faced off against Megatron in San Francisco.

Following the battle, Prime began to experience subconscious urgings, leading both the Autobots and the Decepticons to the Arctic Circle. When they arrived, Shockwave was there to arrest them as war criminals. Shockwave had succeeded in ending the war on Cybertron, but Prime soon fell in with a rebel Autobot group that had discovered Shockwave had greater agenda. Rallying Transformers across Cybertron to the cause, Prime faced Shockwave, but was defeated and had the Matrix ripped from him and used to activate Vector Sigma. Before Shockwave could make full use of the mega computers data, however, Ultra Magnus, Prime's brother, arrived and bested him. The injuries Prime took during this conflict necessitated a prolonged restoration period in stasis, but Dreamwave's closure meant that Prime never appeared in their pages again.

Art from unreleased issues later showed Optimus Prime awakening from the cryo regeneration chamber and freeing Alpha Trion from Shockwave's lab.

Prime would make one further surprise appearance in Dreamwave's Transformers: Armada comic series, although it would not be the Prime of Dreamwave's first series. When the Optimus Prime of the Armada universe disappeared, pulled into another dimension by the power of Unicron, the Chaos-Bringer sent something back in his stead: a nearly dead Optimus Prime from that universe, who warned the Transformers of Unicron's coming into their universe before dying.

IDW Publishing
When IDW Publishing received the rights to the series, author Simon Furman was hired to oversee the line. Furman decided that the Generation 1 continuity "was in need of ... a contemporary restart" so that the comic could retain a modern audience. Furman's revised continuity establishes Optimus Prime as the present-day leader of an Autobot army spread across the galaxy in small units, waging a covert war against teams of Decepticon infiltrators over resource-rich worlds. The Stormbringer miniseries explains that the Transformer homeworld of Cybertron is a dead planet, ravaged by an ancient cataclysm caused by the Autobot-Decepticon War. Prime had been forced to ally with his arch-rival Megatron to end the destruction. In the series, the interference of Jetfire and the Technobots, in a plot organized by the Decepticon Bludgeon, alerts Prime to the possibility that the Cybertronian cataclysm might be re-ignited and spread to other planets. Prime calls in the Wreckers, meeting them on the surface of Cybertron in time to witness the return of the being called Thunderwing, the focal point of the apocalypse. The combined efforts of Prime, the Wreckers, Jetfire, the Predacon-led Decepticons, and a unit of aging Centurion drones are barely enough to render Thunderwing inert.

Bludgeon's recovered files bring Optimus Prime to Earth, where an Autobot detachment led by Prowl has discovered that a Decepticon infiltration unit led by Starscream has broken standard protocol after discovering a new form of Energon. This Ore-13 appears to be the same "Ultra-Energon" that Bludgeon used to revive Thunderwing, who had been dormant for millennia after the apocalypse. Starscream had already used it to fuel a failed attempt to usurp Megatron's leadership, as detailed in the Infiltration miniseries.

In the Escalation miniseries, Megatron engages Prime and, boosted by Ore-13, overcomes him. Believing their leader dead, the rest of the Autobots attempt to buy the newly arrived Hot Rod the time to collect the clone. Prime, who had transferred his consciousness to a backup memory in his trailer command post, advised them to exploit Ore-13's weakness and assault Megatron all-out, catalyzing the Decepticon leader's Energon supply and crippling him.

Bumblebee, Jazz, Optimus Prime, Prowl, and Ratchet appeared in a New Avengers/Transformers crossover by Marvel Comics and IDW Publishing in 2007.

Optimus Prime leads Bumblebee, Drift, Kup, Prowl, Ratchet, and Wheeljack in Las Vegas when a Cybertronian ship crashes, containing Galvatron, Cyclonus, Scourge, and an infestation of zombies from another universe. Galvatron attempts to take command of the Autobots and, after fighting them, explains his mission to stop an undead infestation. Wheeljack sets up an energy shield around the city to keep the infestation contained, but it only last for 24 hours. Despite the containment effort, Kup realizes that Bayonet, a Decepticon in Galvatron's command, is not all she seems. She turns out to be the extradimensional vampire Britt.

Video games
Generation 1 Optimus Prime has appeared in numerous video games since the introduction of the Transformers series. He makes a cameo in the 1999 Beast Wars Transmetals video game for Nintendo 64, where he is killed by Megatron at the end of the campaign, showing what would have happened in the Beast Wars series with a Predacon victory. Prime is also one of the playable characters in the 2003 Japan-only Transformers game for the PlayStation 2 and the 2010 Transformers: War for Cybertron. Optimus Prime is also playable in the Hasbro Net Jet Transformers fighting game Transformers Battle Universe. Three versions of Optimus Prime are playable characters, including the first generation incarnation, his incarnations from the 2007 live-action film, and the incarnation from Transformers Animated. In this game, Optimus Primal is also a playable character. He is a regular character in the Nintendo GameCube and PlayStation 2 2003 fighting game DreamMix TV World Fighters. He appeared as a boss in a simple Flash-based video game on the Hasbro web site.

Generation 1 Optimus Prime is also offered as downloadable content for some versions of the 2009 third-person shooter Transformers: Revenge of the Fallen.

Unicron Trilogy Optimus Prime is among the characters appearing in the 2004 Transformers video game for the PlayStation 2.

Movie Optimus Prime has appeared in numerous Transformers video games.

In the Autobot Campaign, Optimus Prime provides intelligence and missions to Bumblebee in his search for the Allspark. Eventually, the clues lead the Autobot to Sam Witwicky. After saving Sam from Barricade, Bumblebee finally completes preparations for the Autobots to arrive on Earth. Once on Earth and having informed the two teenagers of their mission, Prime and the Autobots are discovered by Sector 7. Optimus sends Jazz on a high-speed destruction distraction mission, then sends Ironhide to rescue Jazz from a double-threat posed by the government agents and various Decepticon scouts. When Bumblebee is captured, Prime transforms and chases the chopper which from which the small Autobot is tied. After a lengthy chase, Prime manages to catch the net, only to be thrown off by another Cybertronian meteor. As Bumblebee is carried away, Optimus promises he will not fail him again. Jazz informs him that the meteor is not an Autobot. Prime confronts the new threat, who turns out to be the Decepticon Triple Changer Shockwave. The two battle it out across Tranquility before Optimus finally destroys him. During the battle, Optimus overhears Starscream's transmission revealing the location of the Allspark. Optimus then returns to an intel role as he guides Bumblebee in his mission to retrieve the Allspark from Hoover Dam. Unfortunately, the Decepticons manage to free Megatron, leading to the final battle in Mission City. As the Autobots battle it out with the Decepticons to protect Sam and the Allspark, things seem to take a turn for the worse as Megatron finally arrives. Before he can claim the Allspark, Optimus attacks him. Optimus defeats Megatron and leaves him on the ground, seemingly devoid of life. However, just as Sam is giving the Allspark to Optimus, Megatron awakens, leaping at Optimus with his chain-flail out, making one last attempt at defeating his adversary. Optimus grabs the chain, pulling Megatron in closer, and, with the Allspark clutched in his fist, delivers a punch through Megatron's spark, killing him. Optimus reflects on the losses and rewards of this battle, as the Autobots have a new home, but many were killed in the battle. The story ends with Optimus and the Autobots choosing to remain on Earth, proclaiming it as their new home.

Optimus Prime appears near the end of the Decepticon Campaign. Sam and Mikaela inform Optimus that all the Autobots were defeated by the Decepticons. Optimus proclaims that they sacrificed their lives to protect the Allspark, and their sacrifice will not be in vain. Leaving Sam and Mikaela in a safe place, Optimus faces Megatron but is defeated. Weakened and damaged, Optimus crawls to reach the Allspark. However, Megatron attacks Optimus with his chain-flail, killing him.

In Transformers: Autobots, Optimus Prime meets up with the other Autobots to give further commands to his troops. Create-A-Bot, the new rookie, is eager to help in the cause, but Optimus tells him to sit back while the other Autobots fight the Decepticons. Create-A-Bot finally defies orders and completes a mission against Optimus's council. After nearly getting himself and the other Autobots killed, Create-A-Bot apologizes to Optimus personally. Taking pity on the newcomer, Optimus lets him off with a stern warning, and they move out together to face Megatron, who has absorbed the power of the Allspark. Optimus fights Megatron, but Megatron gains the upper-hand. Optimus is on the verge of defeat when Create-A-Bot takes the Allspark and drives to Megatron's chest, weakening Megatron but mortally wounding himself in the process. Optimus fights Megatron again, defeating him. As Megatron is on the ground, he tells Optimus that if he kills him, the Allspark will be destroyed and Cybertron will never be restored. Optimus says to Megatron that he will do what he must do, then he raises his sword and kills Megatron, destroying the Allspark in the process. Create-A-Bot also dies, but not before telling Optimus his final request to make Earth the new home of the Autobots and to protect the humans. The game ends with Optimus sending a message to all surviving Autobots taking refuge among the stars.

In Transformers: Decepticons, Optimus Prime lands on Earth along with the other Autobots to stop the Decepticons. Optimus does not appear until Megatron is released and Starscream escapes with the Allspark. Optimus fights Megatron but is defeated and is killed while Megatron gives chase to his traitorous second-in-command. In the 2009 Revenge of the Fallen video game by Activision, Optimus Prime is among the playable characters.

Optimus Prime is also among the characters who appear in the flash game TRANSFORMERS CVBERVERSE Battle Builder Game. Optimus Prime is one of the Autobots featured in Transformers: The Ride at Universal Studios theme parks. In the ride, Optimus fends off against the invading Decepticons at N.E.S.T. headquarters while telling Evac to escape with the AllSpark shard. He battles Megatron throughout the ride until Megatron is killed by Evac. Optimus then congratulates Evac and the riders for protecting the AllSpark.

Animated Optimus Prime is one of the playable characters in the 2008 Transformers Animated video game for the Nintendo DS.

A younger version of Prime Optimus Prime is one of the playable Autobot characters in the 2010 video game Transformers: War for Cybertron. In the Autobot campaign, he starts off as Optimus, a warrior who rallies his fellow autobots against the Decepticons following the reported death of their leader Zeta Prime. He succeeds in defending the Autobots' home city of Iacon from Starscream and his forces. Optimus then receives a distress call from Zeta Prime. Knowing that this is most likely a trap set by Megatron, he proceeds anyway with a rescue mission. He lets himself, Bumblebee, and Sideswipe be captured by the Decepticons and is sent to a prison in Kaon, the decepticon capital, in an elaborate scheme to free Zeta Prime and all imprisoned Autobots. He frees all the other prisoners, and defeats Soundwave and his minions Frenzy, Rumble, and Laserbeak, but he is too late to save Zeta Prime. After taking Zeta Prime's body back to the Autobot high council, he is bestowed upon the well earned title of Prime.

Optimus Prime is then informed that Megatron has infected the core of Cybertron with dark energon and is given the task to undo the damage done. After rescuing Omega Supreme, Optimus, Ironhide, and Prowl fight their way to the core, but it's too late. The core informs Optimus that it is far too corrupted. It can repair itself by shutting down, but it will take millions of years. By that time, Cybertron will have to become cold, barren, and uninhabitable. The core gives Optimus a small piece of itself, saying it will still survive as long as the piece does. Optimus accepts the burden and the core relinquishes the Autobot Matrix of Leadership.

Realizing that the planet is dying, Optimus orders a mass evacuation of all Autobot cities, but many transport ships are destroyed by the Decepticon satellite Trypticon, under orders from Megatron that no one shall leave the planet. He orders the Aerialbots Jetfire, Silverbolt and Air Raid to fly and destroy Trypticon. The aerial trio manages to destroy Trypticon's jet pack and send the Decepticon behemoth crashing into Cybertron, where Optimus Prime and the Autobots band together to narrowly defeat him, sending him plunging into a pool of raw energon. Optimus and the remaining Autobots volunteer to stay and defend Cybertron from Megatron for as long as possible while the rest evacuate the planet. He commissions a massive vessel known as the Ark to transport the remaining Autobots into space when the time comes.

In the Nintendo DS game War for Cybertron: Autobots, Optimus Prime and Bumblebee are the initial two characters playable in the game. Optimus Prime appears in the next game, Transformers: Fall of Cybertron.

Toys

Through the years, there have been many action figures made in the likeness of the original incarnation of Optimus Prime, some of which have been featured in fiction, others of which have not. Additionally, some toy makers have made unlicensed toys in his image or accessories for the existing toys. The original 1984 Optimus Prime toy was part of Takara's 1983 Diaclone toy line named "Battle Convoy". It was designed by the creative design team of Hiroyuki Obara, Shoji Kawamori, famous for his work in Macross, and Kohjin Ohno. The toy's characteristics, such as the head design and the use of the cab front as the upper torso, have become design elements in nearly every incarnation and variant of Optimus Prime. This particular toy has been reissued multiple times, mostly to commemorate the anniversary of the Transformers franchise. Optimus Prime was also released as an Action Master and Powermaster toy in the original Transformers toy line.

For the Generation 2 toy line, the original Optimus Prime toy was altered somewhat and an electronic sound maker was added. Later Generation 2 toys of Optimus were completely new designs, such as Combat Hero Optimus Prime, Laser Optimus Prime, and Gobot Optimus Prime, who could become a red Lamborghini car. In 2003, Takara introduced the Masterpiece MP-01 Convoy/Optimus Prime. While retaining the original concept of a transforming semi-trailer truck, this die-cast figure incorporated modern toy manufacturing techniques for improved detail and articulation, while, at the same time, captured the look of the cartoon character. It has since been released by both Hasbro and Takara Tomy in different variations. In 2010, a version of the Masterpiece toy, called Masterpiece Convoy Sleep Mode, was released, painted in dark colors to match the appearance of Optimus Prime after his death in the 1986 film. In 2006, Hasbro introduced Alternators Optimus Prime, which turned into a licensed 1:24 scale model Dodge Ram SRT-10. In 2011, Takara Tomy released MP-10 Convoy, a smaller, more show-accurate version of the Masterpiece Optimus Prime figure.

Other merchandise
Optimus Prime is among the three Autobot figures available to play in the Monopoly Transformers Collectors Edition game. As the figurehead of the entire Transformers franchise, Optimus Prime has been on more pieces of merchandise than can be stated here. Several statues and busts of Optimus Prime as well as Optimus Prime themed objects have been released by various companies since the return of Transformers to prominence, such as the "Optimus Prime Oral Care Station". Other figures released include various PVCs as part of Takara's "Super Collection Figure" line, which were later imported as part of Hasbro's "Heroes of Cybertron" series. Larger "Mega Collection Figure" PVCs were articulated and came with energy axe and gun figures. As part of the merchandising wave for the first Transformers film in 2007, Hasbro's Playskool line released a Transformers-themed version of Mr. Potato Head based on Optimus Prime. To keep with the potato theme, the toy was labeled "Optimash Prime" and the packaging included the slogan "More than meets the fry", a potato-oriented version of the Transformers slogan "More than meets the eye".

Transformers film series

Optimus Prime appears in the Transformers live-action film series as the leader of the Autobots and one of the main protagonists. In the first three films, he is able to transform into a long-nose conventional Peterbilt 379 semi-truck, rather than the cab over design of his original Generation 1 body. In Transformers: Age of Extinction, he gains a first generation-style trailer form before changing into a 2014 Western Star 5700 Concept. Also straying from the G1 design, Prime's vehicle mode is now decorated with red flames painted onto a blue body à la Rodimus Prime, his Generation 1 successor. The reason for the change was due to Director Michael Bay's decree that mass displacement does not occur when they transform, requiring Optimus's vehicle form to have more mass to achieve the desired size in his robot form.

Although the character was redesigned to some extent, like the other characters in the film, many classic design elements remain in his robot mode including a predominantly red torso, primarily blue legs, the presence of windows in his chest, smoke stacks on his shoulders, and a head design influenced by the original, featuring the iconic faceplate and ear finials. The faceplate is able to retract to reveal a mouth. His weapons include his iconic ion blaster, a Barrage cannon, two retractable energon blades that extend from his forearms, which is a homage to Prime's energy axe in the Generation 1 animated series, and two retractable energon hooks that extend from his wrists. The trailer contains an energy axe, a shield, and flight gear. In the later IDW comics, he displays the ability to produce a holographic driver.

At San Diego ComicCon 06, it was announced that original Optimus Prime voice actor, Peter Cullen, would reprise his role for the third film. Cullen has commented that Prime is basically the same in the third film as the previous two, and retains the same basic personality.

Reception
The 2000s film series incarnation of Optimus Prime was met with warm reception. It was named the 30th greatest movie superhero of all time by "Total Film Magazine".

Involvement in the films
 

Optimus first appears in the 2007 Transformers film as the leader of the Autobots in the search for the AllSpark. He intends to destroy it, even if it means sacrificing himself, before the Decepticons can use it to create a new army to conquer the universe. After arriving and scanning a Peterbilt truck, Optimus greets Sam Witwicky and Mikaela Banes, introducing his men and explaining why they have come to Earth. During the final battle, Optimus slays the hate-filled Decepticon Bonecrusher and faces his ancient enemy, Megatron. Unable to match Megatron in combat, Optimus urges Sam to push the AllSpark into his chest, which will destroy them both. Instead, Sam rams the AllSpark into Megatron's chest, destroying it and killing the Decepticon leader. The film ends with Optimus sending out a deep-space signal, inviting other Autobots to join them on Earth.

Optimus Prime returns in Transformers: Revenge of the Fallen. He leads the Autobots as part of NEST in hunting down the remaining Decepticons on Earth. He later engages in a battle with Starscream, Grindor, and a resurrected Megatron. Although Optimus manages to injure Starscream and kill Grindor, he is eventually impaled and killed by Megatron. However, Optimus is resurrected during the battle in Egypt by Sam using the Matrix of Leadership. He is then fused with the dead body of Jetfire, giving him an extremely powerful upgraded mode. After severely maiming Megatron, he kills the Fallen, forcing Megatron and Starscream to retreat. At the end of the film, Optimus thanks Sam for reviving him and again transmits a message to space, hoping to find more Autobots.

Optimus appears again in the 2011 film Transformers: Dark of the Moon. Optimus receives his own armory consisting of weapons and flight tech that transforms into a trailer for him to carry in vehicular form. After assisting NEST operatives in fighting Shockwave at Chernobyl, Optimus learns that the humans have concealed the discovery of an ancient Cybertronian ship on the Moon. He revives his old mentor, Sentinel Prime, with the Matrix of Leadership. However, Sentinel Prime later betrays the Autobots, murders Ironhide, wipes out most of NEST, and brings an army of Decepticons to Earth with Space Bridge pillars. During the battle of Chicago, Optimus kills Shockwave, the Driller, and many Decepticon protoforms. Finally, Optimus challenges the traitorous Sentinel Prime and they engage in a fierce duel. At first, Optimus appears to have the upper hand, but Sentinel eventually overpowers him and severs his right arm. However, before Sentinel can deliver the killing blow, Megatron attacks and severely injures him, having realized that he will never be able to remain leader of the Decepticons as long as Sentinel is at large. Megatron attempts to make a false truce with Optimus, but Optimus doesn't fall for it and attacks Megatron, decapitating him with his battle-axe. Optimus then executes the wounded Sentinel with Megatron's shotgun. With the Decepticons defeated and the war finally over, Optimus and the Autobots accept Earth as their new home.
 
For Transformers: Age of Extinction, Optimus Prime initially transforms into a rusty 1973 Marmon semi cab-over truck and later on a new alternate mode in a blue and red Western Star 5700 Custom semi-truck. After humanity turns on all Transformers, regardless of faction, Optimus and the other Autobots go into hiding. Eventually, they find themselves being hunted by a rogue organization called Cemetery Wind. Optimus is severely injured in a trap set by the group, while many of the other Autobots, including Ratchet and Leadfoot, are slain. An inventor, Cade Yeager, comes to Prime's aid and helps restore his health. After uniting with a small band of Autobots, Optimus faces Lockdown, a ruthless assassin and bounty hunter allied with the humans, and KSI, an organization that produces man-made Transformers. Optimus is captured by Lockdown, but the Autobots rescue him. Optimus is quickly losing faith in humanity, but at the urging of Cade, chooses to stay and fight Galvatron (a resurrected Megatron) and his new army. Prime releases the ancient Dinobots, and rides a newly tamed Grimlock into battle through Hong Kong. He kills Lockdown and Harold Attinger at the film's climax, avenging his friends, such as Ratchet and Leadfoot. At the end of the film, he leaves Earth and flies off into deep space, seeking to find out the truth about his mysterious Creators.

Optimus Prime returns in Transformers: The Last Knight, which is set three years after the events of the previous film. Having been frozen in the vacuum of space, Optimus has been drifting on the far reaches of the Earth's solar system for some time. However, he later crash-lands on Cybertron, its atmosphere reviving him. He then confronts the being currently in control of the planet, a powerful sorceress named Quintessa, who confesses to be the maker he is searching for. Optimus is easily subdued by Quintessa, who convinces him that he destroyed Cybertron and reveals that the Earth is actually Cybertron's "ancient enemy" Unicron. Redubbing him "Nemesis Prime", Quintessa brain-washes Optimus and tasks him with retrieving her stolen staff, with which she plans to drain Earth/Unicron's life force so that Cybertron can be restored. Nemesis succeeds in retrieving the staff, but is hindered by Bumblebee, whom he engages in a fierce duel. Nemesis nearly kills Bumblebee, but when the normally mute Bumblebee suddenly speaks, urging Prime to remember who he is, the sound of his oldest friend's voice is enough for Optimus to return. However, Megatron, revealed to be in league with Quintessa, swoops in and steals the staff from Optimus. Prime is then attacked and sentenced to death by the Guardian Knights for aiding Quintessa, but he is saved by Cade Yeager, who convinces Optimus to help him save Earth. Optimus leads the Autobots in the attack on Quintessa's lair, during which he slays the Infernocons and defeats Megatron. Optimus then attacks Quintessa, distracting her long enough for Bumblebee to shoot and seemingly vaporize her. At the end of the film, Optimus and the other Autobots return to Cybertron, unaware that Quintessa is actually still alive.

Optimus Prime returns in the 2018 film Bumblebee, initially a prequel and later declared as a reboot. As the Decepticons are defeating the Autobots in a war on Cybertron, Optimus Prime orders the surviving Autobots to evacuate, and sends Autobot scout B-127 to establish a base on Earth for the Autobots to regroup. To buy time for him to escape, Prime fends off an army of Decepticons. Later in 1987, teenage girl Charlie Watson finds and befriends B-127, whom she names "Bumblebee". She accidentally unlocks a holographic message from Optimus Prime about B-127's mission, restoring Bumblebee's memories of watching Optimus fighting many Decepticons while escaping from Cybertron. The message is activated again when Bumblebee is interrogated by Decepticons Shatter and Dropkick. Optimus later reunites with Bumblebee, driving alongside him. In a mid-credits scene, he praises Bumblebee for protecting the Earth, as they walk together through a forest.

Optimus Prime will return in the upcoming film Transformers: Rise of the Beasts and will also feature the his Beast Wars counterpart, Optimus Primal.

Film incarnation
During the promotion of the Transformers films, Optimus Prime appeared in several commercials. Optimus Prime, along with other Transformers, were featured in several commercials for General Motors. Scenes with Optimus Prime were used in several General Motors commercials. A commercial for the Discovery Channel featured Optimus Prime singing part of a promotional song.

Optimus also appeared on the Late Show with David Letterman, giving "The Top Ten Things That Sound Cool When Spoken by a Giant Robot".

Honors
At BotCon 2010, Hasbro named Optimus Prime as one of the first five robot inductees in the Transformers Hall of Fame.

In March 2023, Optimus Prime received a Lifetime Achievement Award from the Nickelodeon Kids' Choice Awards.

See also

References

Bibliography

External links

Pages on Optimus Prime at the Transformers Wiki

3H Enterprises characters
Action film characters
Devil's Due Publishing characters
Extraterrestrial superheroes
Fictional characters with superhuman strength
Fictional commanders
Fun Publications characters
Male characters in animated series
Male characters in comics
Male characters in film
Robot characters in video games
Science fiction film characters
Television characters introduced in 1984
Transformers characters